Kramerhof is a municipality in the Vorpommern-Rügen district, in Mecklenburg-Vorpommern, Germany.

Groß Kedingshagen Manor lies in the municipality.

References